Ann Rosener (November 25, 1914 – May 19, 2012) was an American photojournalist who is remembered for her photographs of home front activities for the Farm Security Administration and the United States Office of War Information in 1942–43.

Biography
The daughter of well-to-do parents in the San Francisco area, Rosener graduated from Smith College in 1935. From about June 1941 until June 1943, she photographed for the Farm Security Administration in Washington, D.C., Maryland, Iowa, Wisconsin, Michigan, Illinois and California. Her images cover women handling men's jobs and girls producing gas masks or working as mechanics. She also illustrated stories showing how Americans were working together to build tanks and planes, irrespective of creed or colour. Many photographs show the efforts of handicapped workers.
Her obituary in the San Francisco Chronicle refers to her 

In the 1950s, Rosener worked as a fashion photographer in Hollywood but returned to the San Francisco area in the 1960s. 
From 1964, she worked for Stanford University designing exhibition catalogues. 
From 1977, she published works by little-known writers. She died in Menlo Park in May 2012.

Gallery

References

External links

Over 800 photographs credited to "Rosener, Ann" are available in the Library of Congress, Prints & Photographs Division, FSA/OWI Collection.

Photographers from San Francisco
American photojournalists
1914 births
2012 deaths
American women photographers
Smith College alumni
Stanford University staff
21st-century American women
Women photojournalists